Anna-Lena Grönefeld was the defending champion, but chose not to participate that year.

Émilie Loit won in the final 7–6(7–0), 6–4 against Flavia Pennetta.

Seeds

Draw

Finals

Top half

Bottom half

External links
 Main and Qualifying draw

2007 Abierto Mexicano Telcel
Abierto Mexicano Telcel